USS Caney (AO-95) was an  acquired by the United States Navy for use during World War II. She had the dangerous but necessary task of providing fuel to vessels in combat and non-combat areas. She served in the Pacific Ocean Theatre of operations late in the war, and returned home with two battle stars.

Caney was launched on 8 October 1944 by Marinship Corp., Sausalito, California, under a Maritime Commission contract; sponsored by Mrs. J. L. Simpson; acquired by the Navy on 25 March 1945, and commissioned the same day and reported to the Pacific Fleet.

World War II Pacific Theatre operations  
Caney sailed from San Pedro, California, on 12 May 1945 for Ulithi, the base from which she operated while fueling ships serving on radar picket and patrol duties at Okinawa. From 3 July through the end of the war, she steamed with the logistic group supporting task force TF 38 in its bombardments and air strikes pounding the Japanese home islands.

End-of-war activity 
The oiler remained off Okinawa serving ships engaged in occupation duty until 16 November, when she got underway for San Francisco, California, and Galveston, Texas. Caney was decommissioned on 27 February 1946 at Beaumont, Texas, and delivered to the War Shipping Administration the same day.

Service under MSTS 
Reacquired by the Navy in February 1948, she was transferred to the Military Sea Transportation Service on 18 July 1950, where she served as USNS Caney (T-AO-95) in a noncommissioned status with a civilian crew.

Caney was placed out of service and struck from the Naval Register on 21 May 1959. She was then transferred to MARAD for lay up in the National Defense Reserve Fleet, Mobile, Alabama.

Service under the U.S. Army 
Caney was acquired by the United States Army in 1966 and converted at Bender Shipbuilding and Repair Co., Mobile, Alabama, into a floating power station for Vietnam service.

Fate 
She was sold for scrapping on 9 September 1974, at Vung Tau, South Vietnam.

Awards  
Caney received two battle stars for World War II service.

References

External links 
 Navsource USS Caney (AO-95)

 

Escambia-class oilers
Type T2-SE-A2 tankers of the United States Navy
Ships built in Sausalito, California
1944 ships
World War II tankers of the United States